Cecilia Ceccarelli is an Italian astronomer known for her research on astrochemistry and the spectroscopy of protostars. She was named as the female scientist of the year in the 2006 Irène Joliot-Curie Prizes. 

Ceccarelli completed her Ph.D. in 1982 at Sapienza University of Rome.

References

External links

Year of birth missing (living people)
Living people
21st-century Italian astronomers
Women astronomers
Sapienza University of Rome alumni